Mayuge District is a district in Eastern Uganda. Like many other Ugandan districts, it is named after its 'chief town', Mayuge, where the district headquarters are located.

Location
Mayuge District is bordered by Iganga District to the north, Bugiri District to the northeast, Namayingo District to the east, the Republic of Tanzania to the south, and Jinja District to the west. The coordinates of the district are:00 20N, 33 30E.

Overview
Prior to 2000, Mayuge District was known as Bunya County and was part of Iganga District. Present day Mayuge District, Iganga District, Kamuli District, Jinja District, Kaliro District and Bugiri District,  constitute the Busoga Kingdom. A large proportion of the district surface area is open water of Lake Victoria. It is estimated that this represents 77% of the total surface area in the district. Another 10% of the district is protected national forest reserve. The district has many Islands which are currently occupied by permanent and migratory fishermen.  These include the Islands of Seguti, Dagusi, Vumba, Kaza, Nambuga and Simu.  The Islands are all easily accessible by motor boat or canoe.

Population
In 1991, the national population census estimated the district population at about 216,800. The 2002 national census estimated the population of the district to be about 324,700 people, of whom 51.2% were female and 48.8% were male. The district population annual growth rate was calculated at 3.6%. In 2012, it was estimated that the population of Mayuge District was approximately 461,200.

Economic activities
Due to fertile soils and favorable climate, Mayuge District has great agricultural potential. However, the fact that open water and natural forest reserves occupy an estimated 87% of the surface area of the district, significant pressure has been exerted on the natural environment from the increasing population numbers. Most of the agriculture in the district is on the subsistence level. The crops grown include the following:.

Fishing is another high-value activity practiced in the district. This activity is the largest income earner in the district, accounting for 63% and 52% of the district revenue in 2002 and 2003 respectively. In 2004, an estimated 2,600 people were engaged in commercial fishing in Mayuge District. The fish caught from Lake Victoria include: (a) Nile Perch (b) Tilapia (c) Rargentae (Mukene) (d) Clarias (Cat fish) and (e) Protopterus (Lung fish).

In recent times, bee keeping for production of honey, is becoming an accepted and practiced method of earning an income in the district.

See also
 Mayuge
 Busoga sub-region
 Districts of Uganda

References

External links
 Mayuge District Homepage
 Profile of Mayuge District

 
Districts of Uganda
Eastern Region, Uganda